Eugaleaspidiformes (from Latin, "Helmet shield shapes") is an extinct order of jawless marine and freshwater fish, which lived in East Asia from the Telychian to the Lower Devonian period. The order was first named by Lui in 1965.

Examples
Nochelaspis
Shuyu
Falxcornus
Dunyu
Xitunaspis
Yongdongaspis
Qingshuiaspis
Anjiaspis

References

Galeaspida
Early Devonian extinctions
Prehistoric fish orders